The William Pitt Union, built in 1898 as the Hotel Schenley, is the student union building of the University of Pittsburgh main campus, and is a Pennsylvania and Pittsburgh History and Landmarks Foundation Historic Landmark. Designed by Pittsburgh-based architects Rutan & Russell in the Beaux-Arts style of architecture, the Schenley Hotel catered to local and visiting well-to-do people. The University of Pittsburgh acquired the property in 1956.

History

The Schenley
The building, originally known as the Hotel Schenley and designed by architects Rutan & Russell, opened in 1898, became the keystone of entrepreneur Franklin Nicola’s dream of Oakland as a center for culture, art and education. Nicola had been instrumental in the formation of the Bellefield Company with the help of Andrew W. Mellon, Henry Clay Frick, Andrew Carnegie, George Westinghouse and H.J. Heinz, who were among the first stockholders to share Nicola’s vision for Oakland. They erected the beaux-arts structure on land once owned by fellow stockholder Mary Croghan Schenley.  The Schenley Hotel was Pittsburgh's first large, steel-framed "skyscraper hotel" it was described as "Pittsburgh's class hotel of the early 20th century".

Famous guests

Full of marble, chandeliers, and Louis XV architecture, the Schenley quickly became the Pittsburgh home to the great and the near-great. Presidents Woodrow Wilson, Theodore Roosevelt, William Howard Taft, and Dwight D. Eisenhower signed the register at the Schenley, as did Eleanor Roosevelt.

Singer-actress Lillian Russell lived in suite 437 and married Pittsburgh publisher Alexander Moore in the French Room (now a dining room on the first floor). Dramatic tenor Enrico Caruso and his entourage occupied seven suites during their stay. Sarah Bernhardt, Nelson Eddy, Jeanette MacDonald, Henry Fonda, Katharine Hepburn, and Spencer Tracy stayed at the Schenley. Italian tragedian Eleonora Duse succumbed to pneumonia in suite 524.

The Schenley was not just the place to stay in Pittsburgh as the 20th century began: it was where the young ladies of society "came out," where couples married, and where one could dine on the "haute cuisine" of the day. It was also the place where Pittsburgh power brokers met and many of the discussions leading to the birth of the U.S. Steel Corporation were held at the Schenley. Its formation was celebrated at the "Meal of Millionaires" in 1901. Later in 1914, the Veterans of Foreign Wars (VFW) was organized at the Schenley Hotel. The state of Pennsylvania dedicated a historical marker outside of union in 1967 to commemorate the event. Many famous industrialists and businessmen, including Andrew Carnegie and Diamond Jim Brady, had eaten at various times at the hotel.

1909 was a year that changed the Hotel Schenley forever. That summer, Forbes Field opened just down the street and the University of Pittsburgh moved from its Northside location to Oakland. From that time on, the "Waldorf of Pittsburgh" gradually became the home of the National League baseball players in town to play the Pittsburgh Pirates, and students and faculty took their place among the Pittsburgh elite. Now added to the register were names such as Babe Ruth, Casey Stengel, Ty Cobb, and Rogers Hornsby. The deals struck over dinner at the Schenley now included baseball trades.

For the next 40-plus years the Schenley continued to operate albeit on a less grand scale. Pittsburgh's Renaissance I brought modern hotels to downtown Pittsburgh and, ironically, Frank Nicola's dream of an Oakland civic center turned out to be a nightmare for the Schenley. The turn-of-the-century marvel had been built in rural Pittsburgh. The 1950s Schenley was surrounded by hospitals, educational facilities, concert halls, and private clubs with no parking to serve the hotel's mobile guests.

A part of Pitt

In 1956, the then Schenley Park Hotel was sold to the University of Pittsburgh. The hotel underwent a $1 million ($ in  dollars) renovation to convert it to university use. The top four floors first served as a men's dormitory called Schenley House while the rest of the building was purposed as a  student union, which was named Schenley Hall.

Shortly after this, during the height of the cold war in September 1959, the Schenley Hall ballroom in the Union was the site of a luncheon for Nikita Khrushchev, chairman of the Soviet Union, and various Soviet and U.S. officials, including Henry Cabot Lodge, Jr. that was hosted by the University of Pittsburgh and Pitt Chancellor Edward Litchfield. Pittsburgh and the university was the last stop in his eleven-day transcontinental tour prior to a three-day conference with President Dwight D. Eisenhower.  The New York Times  proclaimed "Pittsburgh Stop Warmest of Tour".

As the student population of the Pittsburgh campus blossomed to 30,000-plus and their activities diversified and grew, it became clear that the grand structure needed an overhaul.

In 1980, the university announced a $13.9 million ($ in  dollars) renovation and restoration for the Union, made possible by bonds sold through the Allegheny County Higher Education Building Authority.

During the 18-month project and restoration led by Williams Trebilcock Whitehead, seven upper floors were gutted to make way for modern offices for students and the student affairs administration. A 10th floor, which had been added several years after the hotel was first built, was removed to relieve stress on the building. However, the turn-of-the-century character of the main floor was restored through careful restoration of the Louis XV mirrored ballroom, the lower lounge that had enclosed the original Bigelow Boulevard-side porch 13 years after the hotel was originally built, and the marbled-wall former hotel lobby, now called the Tansky Family Lounge, which includes the "stairway to nowhere", a remnant of a previous renovation. In addition, the rarely used basement was transformed into a functional lower level with a new Forbes Avenue Entrance and plaza. The original wooden hotel room doors salvage from the upstairs renovation were used for the walls of the lower-level student recreation room, now called "Nordy's Place".  Further, a third west entrance facing the university's Schenley Quadrangle and Litchfield Towers dormitories was added and included a new multi-level glass roofed atrium just inside the new entrance. The renovations were completed in 1983 and the building was renamed the William Pitt Union.

Legends

A ghostly legend passed down among students begins with the story of a visit by the Russian National Ballet where it took up accommodations in the historic Schenley Hotel prior to opening its tour of the United States in Pittsburgh. The prima ballerina, tired from travel, decided to rest before the premiere performance, drifted off, and slept through her curtain call and the whole of the performance. The company's director, either so incensed by her missing the premiere, or so impressed by the stage presence of her understudy, decided to replace the prima ballerina with the young upstart for the remainder of the tour. The ballerina was so distraught that she took her own life that night, ashamed and humiliated that she would be replaced by the young understudy. It is now said if one were to ever take a nap or fall asleep for whatever reason in the Tansky Family Lounge, also known as the Red Room, they will always wake up just in time for whatever exam, class, meeting, appointment, etc. they may have missed. The Prima Ballerina haunts the room to make sure they never succumb to her same fate.

Another tale tells of a ghost haunting the Lillian Russell Room, room 437 within the offices of The Pitt News, in the area of Lillian Russell's former residence when the union served as the Schenley Hotel.

A notable infamous incident at the Schenley Hotel occurred on July 12, 1950, when a hotel night guard went on a shooting spree that resulted in the deaths of two men and the wounding of another.

Current use

The William Pitt Union now serves as the student union and hub of the University of Pittsburgh and contains a variety of lounges, ballrooms, reception, performance, and meeting spaces. One of the most notable facilities is the Louis XV style William Pitt Union Ballroom on the main floor which features vaulted ceiling, mirrored walls, two grand crystal chandeliers, and detailed moldings and artwork that are faithful restored to the condition of the Hotel Schenley. Other formal rooms include the Kurtzman Room and lower atrium of the Tansky Family lounge on the main floor, as well as two dining rooms on the first floor. The Tansky Lounge itself is the restored grand lobby of the hotel. The William Pitt Union is also the home to the International Academy of Jazz Hall of Fame (dedicated in 1984), C. M. Kimbo Art Gallery, a dance studio, meeting and conference rooms, university offices, and, on the lower level, a food court. The upper floors of the union serve as the primary location for the offices for over 300 student organizations, including the student newspaper, The Pitt News, the student radio station, WPTS, and the student government. The fourth floor also contains Lillian Russell Room of The Pitt News office which is the location of her former residence during the union's days as the Schenley Hotel. The Russell Room contains a portrait or Russell, a fireplace, stained glass fanlight, decorative moldings, and other elements. In 2007, the recreation room on the ground floor of the union was renovated and by resolution of the Pitt Student Government Board in December 2007, was named "Nordy's Place" in honor of Chancellor Mark Nordenberg who the board resolved was a student favorite and worthy of the honor. Gigs Game Center, outfitted with videogame hardware and software, is also located on the lower level. In 2009, renovations to the second floor improved the accommodations of the student careers center and renovations to the fifth floor were completed to provide six new meeting spaces for student organizations, four of which with hard-surface flooring enabling groups to practice dance routines and other activities. In addition, a formal area was created where student organizations can host special events such as workshops and award presentations. In 2010, a $2 million project was undertaken to renovate  of space on the ninth floor. The renovation, completed in 2011, created a new student study and lounge area, a 20-person conference room, a kitchen/coffee area, file/storage areas, and new offices for Residence Life, and Pitt Arts, and Student Volunteer Outreach. A $1.93 million renovation of the Assembly Room, which included uncovering three large windows to allow in natural light, as well as a stage extension and technology upgrades, was completed in 2013. In addition, a $390,000 renovation of  first floor restrooms and $1.85 million renovation of the lower levels of the union, including its food court and dining spaces, was completed in 2013.

Gallery

References

External links

William Pitt Union home page
William Pitt Union renovations on Architizer
International Academy of Jazz Hall of Fame
Conney M. Kimbo Art Gallery
The Pitt News
WPTS Radio
Student Government Board
Division of Student Affairs

Video
History of the William Pitt Union

University of Pittsburgh buildings
Hotel buildings completed in 1898
Beaux-Arts architecture in Pennsylvania
Pittsburgh History & Landmarks Foundation Historic Landmarks
Student activity centers in the United States
Historic district contributing properties in Pennsylvania
1898 establishments in Pennsylvania
National Register of Historic Places in Pittsburgh
University and college buildings on the National Register of Historic Places in Pennsylvania